The Lancashire Steel Corporation Ltd was a United Kingdom steel producer. The company was formed in 1930 by amalgamating the iron and steel interests of the Pearson & Knowles Coal & Iron Co, the Partington Steel & Iron Co, and the Wigan Coal & Iron Co. The company was nationalised in 1951, becoming part of the Iron and Steel Corporation of Great Britain, but de-nationalised shortly afterwards. It was renationalised in 1967, becoming part of the British Steel Corporation.

The main works were at Irlam.

Sources

 Whitaker's Almanack (various dates)

Defunct companies of the United Kingdom
Steel companies of the United Kingdom
Former nationalised industries of the United Kingdom
1930 establishments in England
History of Salford
Companies based in Salford
British companies established in 1930
Manufacturing companies established in 1930